Uljma is a village in Serbia. It is situated in the Vršac municipality, in the South Banat District, Vojvodina province. The village has a Serb ethnic majority (83.01%) with a present Romanian minority (11.11%) and its population numbering 3,089 people (2011 census).

History
Bronze Age graves of steppe nomads was found in the village.

Geography
Uljma is situated between villages Vlajkovac, Izbište and Nikolinci.

Historical population
1961: 4,237
1971: 4,391
1981: 4,115
1991: 3,961
2002: 3,598
2011: 3,089

References

Slobodan Ćurčić, Broj stanovnika Vojvodine, Novi Sad, 1996.

See also
List of places in Serbia
List of cities, towns and villages in Vojvodina

Populated places in Serbian Banat
Populated places in South Banat District
Vršac